Events in the year 2021 in Cambodia.

Incumbents
Monarch: Norodom Sihamoni
Prime Minister: Hun Sen

Events
Ongoing — COVID-19 pandemic in Cambodia
 21 April - Government of Cambodia imposes lockdown on COVID-19 red zones.
 4 May - Journalists banned from reporting in COVID-19 lockdown area as cases soar.
 5 May - Possible humanitarian crisis as multiple people in restricted areas report lack of foods.
 7 October - Prime Minister: Hun Sen says that the government might make amendments to the country’s Constitution that would ban dual citizens from serving in the country’s top political posts
 25 October - The National Assembly (Cambodia) passed amendments to the constitution, banning the prime minister, presidents of the National Assembly, Senate and the Constitutional Council from having dual citizens.
 3 November - The King signs the Dual citizenship law ban.

Deaths

13 January – Norodom Yuvaneath, royal (born 1943).

References

 

 
2020s in Cambodia
Years of the 21st century in Cambodia
Cambodia
Cambodia